CHIM is a Canadian radio station, which previously broadcast Christian music at 102.3 FM in Timmins, Ontario. The station also currently broadcasts at 1710 AM.

The station began testing its signal at 102.3 MHz on December 24, 1995, and officially signed on April 7, 1996. The station has expanded through a network of rebroadcast transmitters in Northern Ontario. CHIM-FM also has a rebroadcaster in Red Deer, Alberta, CHIM-FM-5, which originates some of its own programming.

Its call letters were pronounced, on air, as See Him.

Programming
The station's best-known program was the MAD Christian Radio Show, a Christian rock show hosted by Kristen McNulty, which originally started as a show on CHIM. Today it is syndicated to Christian radio stations across Canada and internationally.

Other programming aired on the station includes Charles Stanley's In Touch and Tristan Emmanuel's No Apologies.

Transmitters

CHIM-FM-5 in Red Deer, Alberta was licensed as a repeater of CHIM, but broadcast some local programming for the Red Deer area. The transmitter operated at 93.1 FM. CHIM-FM-5 would go dark in November 2012 with the revocation of CHIM's licenses.

In 2000, CHIM's application to add a transmitter in Toronto at 106.3 MHz was denied. In 2001, CHIM's application to add a transmitter in Vancouver, British Columbia at 92.9 MHz was denied. CHIM's application to add a transmitter at 102.3 MHz in Cochrane was denied as well in 2008. An unrelated radio station, CFCJ-FM owned by Cochrane Christian Radio to operate a new English language Christian radio station at Cochrane on 102.1 MHz received CRTC approval on April 18, 2011.

The station's licence renewal application was denied by the CRTC on October 23, 2012 due to regulatory violations. As a result, CHIM-FM was ordered to cease broadcasting Christian music by the end of the broadcast day on November 30, 2012. CHIM was relicensed as Information radio by Industry Canada. CHIM remains active via an online stream on their website, as well as transmitting on 1710 AM.

By September 2014, CHIM returned to terrestrial radio in Timmins at 1710 kHz. In 2017, CHIM plans to expand its Christian radio service to Sudbury (1600 AM), Parry Sound, Orillia, Toronto (VFU545 101.7), Calgary, Edmonton and Vancouver. CHIM Radio is also coming to Sudbury at 101.7 FM with a Christian music format.

Info Radio
CHIM's owner, Roger de Brabant, also operates a number of low-powered tourist information radio stations branded as Info Radio. These stations also use the "Canada's Good News Network", or "Part of the Good News Network" slogan on air sometimes, but do not share the CHIM network's Christian programming. These stations were unaffected by the CRTC decision, and remain on air.

According to the CHIM website, Hearst was listed as CFCL-FM 95.5 and Smooth Rock Falls CKSO-FM 101.9.

In 2017, CHTI launched a new website CHTI Radio Network.

References

External links
 CHIM-FM
 
 

Him
Him
Radio stations established in 1996
1996 establishments in Ontario